Jocelyn Pua Tulfo (born Jocelyn Pua) is a Filipino politician. She is the wife of incumbent Senator Raffy Tulfo and is a member of the Philippine House of Representatives for the ACT-CIS Partylist since 2019.

References 

Date of birth missing (living people)
Living people
Party-list members of the House of Representatives of the Philippines
Tulfo family
Year of birth missing (living people)
Women members of the House of Representatives of the Philippines
Far Eastern University alumni
21st-century Filipino women politicians